Georgia Satellites is the first album released by the Georgia Satellites. It contains their biggest hit, "Keep Your Hands to Yourself" (which reached No. 2 on the Billboard Hot 100, behind Bon Jovi's "Livin' on a Prayer"), and another minor hit, "Battleship Chains," written by Terry Anderson. It also contains a cover of "Every Picture Tells a Story," written by Rod Stewart and Ron Wood. Most of the other songs were written by lead singer/rhythm guitarist Dan Baird, except "Red Light," which he co-wrote with Neill Bogan, and "Can't Stand the Pain," written by lead guitarist Rick Richards, who also takes lead vocal on the tune. The album was a commercial success and was certified Gold by the RIAA in February 1987 and then Platinum on August of the same year.

The band would release two more studio albums after this one, but none featured a song with nearly the radio and MTV success as "Keep Your Hands to Yourself," and the band finally split in 1990.

Track listing

Personnel
Adapted credits from the album's liner notes.

Georgia Satellites
Dan Baird – lead vocals , backing vocals, rhythm guitar
Rick Richards – lead guitar, lead vocals , backing vocals
Rick Price – bass
Mauro Magellan – drums

Additional musicians
Randy DeLay – drums 
Dave Hewitt – bass 

Production
Jeff Glixman – producer
Cheryl Bordagaray – assistant engineer
Howie Weinberg – LP mastering (Masterdisk)
Barry Diament – CD mastering (Atlantic Studios)
Hale Milgrim – creative director

Artwork
David Michael Kennedy – photography
Bob Defrin – art direction

Charts

Weekly charts

Year-end charts

Certifications

References

1986 debut albums
The Georgia Satellites albums
Elektra Records albums
Albums produced by Jeff Glixman